Orange County Historical Society may refer to:

Orange County Historical Society, Orange County, Connecticut
Orange County Historical Society (Orange County, California) - Orange County, California
Orange County Historical Society - Orange County, Florida
 Orange County Historical Society (Orange County, Indiana) - Orange County, Indiana 
Orange County Historical Society, Orange County, New York
Orange County Historical Society (Orange County, Virginia) - Orange County, Virginia